Dolce is an Italian-language surname. Notable people with the name include: 

Christine Dolce (1981–2017), American MySpace Internet celebrity and model
Domenico Dolce (born 1958), Italian fashion designer
Joe Dolce (born 1947), American-Australian singer/songwriter
Lodovico Dolce (1508–1568), Italian humanist of the Renaissance

See also

Italian-language surnames